Konrád Mentsik (born 19 April 1942) is a Hungarian gymnast. He competed in eight events at the 1968 Summer Olympics.

References

1942 births
Living people
Hungarian male artistic gymnasts
Olympic gymnasts of Hungary
Gymnasts at the 1968 Summer Olympics
Gymnasts from Budapest